Sergei Viktorovich Lobanov (born 1 March 1984) is a former Russian professional football player.

Club career
He played in the Belarusian Premier League in 2008 for FC Neman Grodno.

External links
 
 

1984 births
People from Lyubertsy
Living people
Russian footballers
Association football midfielders
FC Belshina Bobruisk players
FC Molodechno players
FC Neman Grodno players
FC Sheksna Cherepovets players
Belarusian Premier League players
Russian expatriate footballers
Expatriate footballers in Belarus
FC MVD Rossii Moscow players
Sportspeople from Moscow Oblast